A State of Trance 2007 is the fourth compilation album in the A State of Trance compilation series mixed and compiled by Dutch DJ and record producer Armin van Buuren. The two-disc album was released on 1 May 2007 by Armada Music and Ultra Records.

Track listing

Charts

References

Armin van Buuren compilation albums
Electronic compilation albums
2007 compilation albums